Welcome to the Show is the debut studio album by the Danish heavy metal band Evil Masquerade.  It almost immediately received worldwide recognition and made the charts in Japan at number 8.

Track listing
"Intro (Ride of the Valkyries/Grand Opening)" – 1:42
"Welcome to the Show" – 3:10
"The Wind Will Rise" – 4:53
"Oh Harlequin" – 5:05
"Surprises in the Dark" – 5:35
"But You Were Smiling..." – 4:05
"Children of the Light" – 4:19
"Lucy the Evil" – 6:09
"Badinerie" – 1:36
"Deliver Us" – 5:17
"Evil Masquerade" – 4:07

The Japanese version of the album contains the bonus track:

Kimi ga Yo (君が代).

Personnel
Evil Masquerade
Henrik Flyman – guitar, vocals
Henrik Brockmann – lead vocals
Dennis Buhl – drums
Kasper Gram – bass

Additional musicians
Mats Olausson – keyboard
André Andersen – keyboard
Richard Andersson – keyboard
Lars Boutrup – keyboard
Ex Københavns Drengekor – choir
Sanna Thor – laughter
Anders Juhl Nielsen – trumpet
Katja Handberg – pizzo violin
Monika Pedersen – vocals
Tommy Hansen – moog & bongo

Additional personnel
Written, composed, arranged and produced by Henrik Flyman.
First part of "Intro" is a newly arranged version of Richard Wagner's Ride of the Valkyries, "Badinerie" origins from the Orchestral Suite (BWV 1067) No. 2 in B minor for flute and strings by Johann Sebastian Bach,
"Deliver Us" by Göran Jacobsson/Henrik Flyman.
Recorded by Henrik Flyman at Digital Bitch, drums recorded by Peter Brander and Henrik Flyman at Media Sound.
Mixed by Steen Mogensen at Media Sound.
Mastered by Andy Horn at Famous Kitchen.
Paintings by Katja Handberg
Photos by Thomas Trane
Artwork by Gunbarrel Offensive Design
Originally released by Marquee/Avalon. Re-released by Dark Minstrel Music

References

External links

Evil Masquerade albums
2004 debut albums